The Teacher Registration Board TRBWA is the body responsible for the registration of teachers in Western Australia and registers all teachers, from early childhood to Year 12, who teach in a Western Australian educational venue.  The TRBWA is also responsible for the accreditation of initial teacher education programs in WA.

The TRBWA is a seven member Board appointed by the Minister for Education and is supported by the Teacher Registration Directorate of the Department of Education which provides a secretariat function.

References

External links
 

2012 in education
Education in Western Australia
Statutory agencies of Western Australia
Teaching in Australia